Big Disco is Escanaba Firing Line's first full-length studio album, released in 2006. The album was recorded at Woodshed Studios in Oak Park, Michigan with Tim Pak and features artwork and design by Jesse Younce.

Track listing
All songs written and performed by Escanaba Firing Line.

 "Broken Beat" – 3:36
 "Terra Incognito" – 3:33
 "Moderate Rock Tempo" – 2:47
 "a little island" – 5:03
 "Dakota" – 5:15
 "pinot noir" – 5:52
 "Awkward Child" – 2:33
 "Instrumental" – 4:47
 "False Start" – 11:19
 'Intellectual' (hidden track)
 "In a Valley, On a River" (hidden track)

Personnel

Escanaba Firing Line
 Jesse Younce - guitar, vocals
 Ryan Younce - Guitar, vocals, bass (on "In a Valley, On a River")
 Tony Colombo - bass
 Jeremy VanSice - drums (4, 6-8, 11)
 Luke Purcell – Drums (1-3, 5, 9), Keys (5)

Production
 Tim Pak - engineering, mixing
 The Flying Pauleini Brothers - mixing
 Jesse Younce - art and design
 Jim Ribby - "Civil War Trilogy" sampled on "pinot noir"
 S. Miller - spirit guide
 Matthew James Wind - additional audio samples

References

External links
Big Disco at MusicBrainz
Big Disco at Last.fm

Escanaba Firing Line albums
2006 albums